Steven M. Rales (born March 31, 1951) is an American businessman, film producer, and chairman of Danaher Corporation. He founded Danaher along with his brother Mitchell Rales in 1983. He had a net worth of 7.5 billion as of 2023.

Early life and education
Raised in a Jewish family, Rales is one of four sons of Ruth (née Abramson) and Norman Rales. His father was raised in an orphanage, the Hebrew Orphan Asylum in New York City, and became a businessman, who sold his building supply company in Washington, D.C. to his employees in what was the first employee stock ownership plan (ESOP) transaction in the U.S. His father was also a philanthropist, founding the Norman and Ruth Rales Foundation and the Ruth Rales Jewish Family Service. Steven has three brothers: Joshua, Mitchell, and Stewart.

Rales graduated in 1969 from Walt Whitman High School, in Bethesda, Maryland. In 1973, he graduated from DePauw University, where he was in the Beta Theta Pi fraternity. In 1978, he was awarded a J.D. from the American University.

Investments
In 1979, he left his father's real estate firm to found Equity Group Holdings, with his brother Mitchell Rales.  Using junk bonds, they bought a diversified line of businesses: first Mastershield, a vinyl siding manufacturer, then Mohawk Rubber Company, then Diversified Mortgage Group.  They changed the name to Diversified Mortgage Investors, in 1978, and then Danaher, in 1984.

In 1985, they bought Easco Corporation, the then-largest independent aluminum extrusion manufacturer, and hand tool manufacturer which produced the Craftsman brand of sockets and wrenches for Sears.

In 1988, they made a hostile takeover bid for Interco, a conglomerate comprising manufacturers as diverse as Converse shoes and Ethan Allen furniture.  When the company responded with a poison pill, they sued, and prevailed in court.  They later ended the bid after five months with a profit of $60 million.

In the 1980s, the AM side of WGMS was sold off to Washington, D.C., venture capitalists Steven and Mitchell Rales, who converted the music station into the first frequency for WTEM, a sports-talk station, in 1992.

He has served as Chairman of the Board of Danaher since January 1984.

Steven and Mitchell founded Colfax Corporation in 1995, an industrial pumps manufacturer based in Richmond, Virginia. In 2008, Rales engineered the initial public offering of the company.

Indian Paintbrush 
Rales owns the film production company Indian Paintbrush, which has funded The Darjeeling Limited (2007), and Fantastic Mr. Fox (2009), the latter of which also featured Rales making a voiceover cameo in the role of Beaver.

The company was also involved in Jeff, Who Lives at Home (2011), Moonrise Kingdom (2012), Seeking a Friend for the End of the World (2012), Labor Day (2013), The Grand Budapest Hotel (2014), Me and Earl and the Dying Girl (2015), and Isle of Dogs (2018).

Philanthropy
He has been a major supporter of the Washington Ballet. In 2002, he was a major donor in the dedication of the Peeler Art Center at DePauw University.  He was a donor to GolfRocks.

Personal life
He married Christine Plank in 1983. They have three children, Alexander, Gregory, and Stephanie. They divorced in 2003. In 2012, he married Lalage Damerell.

References

External links
Steve Rales Makes 96-yard touchdown reception in 1970 Monon Bell Classic

1951 births
Living people
American billionaires
Golden Globe Award-winning producers
Jewish American philanthropists
American film producers
Washington College of Law alumni
DePauw University alumni
People from Bethesda, Maryland
Danaher Corporation people
21st-century American Jews
Walt Whitman High School (Maryland) alumni